Selje (municipality) was a municipality in the old Sogn og Fjordane county, Norway and was located in the traditional district of Nordfjord. The village of Selje was the administrative center this municipality. On 1 January 2020 the municipality became part of the new Stad Municipality in the newly formed Vestland county.

Selje municipality had been located at the northwesternmost part of Sogn og Fjordane county. Most of the municipality was located on and around the Stadlandet peninsula as well as some small surrounding islands such as Selja and Barmøya.

At the time of its dissolution in 2020, the  municipality was the 317th largest by area out of the 422 municipalities in Norway. Selje was the 279th most populous municipality in Norway with a population of 2,757.

Selje was one of the first three Episcopal sees in Norway (Oslo, Nidaros, and Selje). After the diocese was moved to Bergen, monks took over the church in Selje, which was later destroyed by pirates in 1536. The municipality of Selje was also home to the Selje Abbey, a former Benedictine monastery located on the island of Selja. Ruins of the abbey and church can still be seen on the island.

General information

Selje was established as a municipality on 1 January 1838 (see formannskapsdistrikt law). The original municipality was identical to the historic Selje prestegjeld with the sub-parishes of Hove and Vågsøy. The municipality originally included all of the Stadlandet peninsula, the island of Vågsøy and the mainland area north of the mouth of the Nordfjorden.

On 1 January 1910, the southwestern district of Vågsøy was separated from Selje to form two new municipalities: Nord-Vågsøy and Sør-Vågsøy. The sub-parish of Hove was renamed Selje at the same time. After the separation, Selje had a population of 3,367 residents.

During the 1960s, there were many municipal mergers across Norway due to the work of the Schei Committee. On 1 January 1964, the municipalities of Nord-Vågsøy and Sør-Vågsøy as well as a small part of southern Selje municipality were merged to form the new Vågsøy Municipality. The parts of Selje involved were the island of Silda, the Hagevik-Osmundsvåg area, and the farms of Sørpollen and Straumen.  There were 344 residents in those areas that were moved out of Selje.

On 1 January 2020, Selje was dissolved as a municipality and it was merged with the neighboring municipality of Eid and the Bryggja-Totland area of Vågsøy and they formed the new Stad Municipality.

Name
The municipality (originally the parish) is named after the small island of Selja, since the first Selje Church was built there. The meaning of the name is unknown. Prior to 1889, the name was written Selø or Selløe.

Coat of arms

The coat of arms was granted on 5 April 1991. They are blue and silver, showing the upper half of a woman with raised arms and crown. The woman is a depiction of Saint Sunniva, the royal Irish missionary who died as a martyr on the island of Selja while trying to convert he locals to Christianity. Later, the Selje Abbey was built on the spot where she died. She was later named the patron saint of the Norwegian Diocese of Bjørgvin and all of Western Norway.

Churches
The Church of Norway has three parishes within the municipality of Selje. It is part of the Nordfjord prosti (deanery) in the Diocese of Bjørgvin.

Also, the ruins of the Selje Abbey (built in 1100) are located on the island of Selja.

Government
All municipalities in Norway, including Selje, are responsible for primary education (through 10th grade), outpatient health services, senior citizen services, unemployment and other social services, zoning, economic development, and municipal roads. The municipality is governed by a municipal council of elected representatives, which in turn elect a mayor.  The municipality falls under the Sogn og Fjordane District Court and the Gulating Court of Appeal.

Municipal council
The municipal council of Selje was made up of 17 representatives that were elected to four year terms. The party breakdown of the final municipal council was as follows:

Mayor
The mayor (ordførar) of a municipality in Norway is a representative of the majority party of the municipal council who is elected to lead the council. Stein Robert Osdal of the Christian People's Party was elected mayor for the 2015–2019 term.

Many previous mayors have later entered national or regional politics: Ottar Nygård, Julius Fure, Magne Aarøen, Åge Starheim, and Sverre J. Hoddevik.

Geography

Selje is located in the northwesternmost part of Sogn og Fjordane county, in the Nordfjord region. It includes the Stad peninsula and the islands of Barmøya, Venøya, and Selja. Selje is surrounded by water on three sides. The Sildagapet bay on the west, the North Sea to the north, and the Vanylvsfjorden to the northeast. Selje municipality is bordered to the south and west by Vågsøy Municipality and to the east by Vanylven and Sande municipalities (in Møre og Romsdal county).

Economy
The main industries in the municipality of Selje have been fishing and farming. These industries are still present in Selje, with the addition of new industries such as fish breeding, boat building, ready-made clothing manufacturing, and service industries. The Skorge Hydroelectric Power Station is located in the municipality.

Villages and neighborhoods
Villages and neighborhoods in the municipality include Barmen, Ervik, Flatraket, Hoddevik, Hoddevika, Håvik, and Leikanger.

Attractions

Selja
On the island of Selja, a 15-minute boat trip from the village of Selje, lie the ruins of the Selje Abbey, its tower still intact. The abbey was built by Benedictine monks early in the 12th century in honour of St. Sunniva. The legend of St. Sunniva who was martyred here lives on. Norway has two male saints (St. Olav and St. Hallvard) and one female one, St. Sunniva, the guardian saint of Western Norway. According to legend, Sunniva, daughter of an Irish king, fled when her country was conquered by heathens and the new king wanted to marry her. She came ashore on the island of Selja. The St. Sunniva cave where Sunniva is said to have died is a large cavern containing remains of walls and traces of the first church dedicated to the Archangel Michael.

The island of Selja is also home to the following sites:
The site of the first Selje Church which was later moved to the mainland. The ruins of St. Sunniva's Church on the site where Olav Trygvasson built one of the first churches in Norway.
The ruins of St. Alban's Church, the monastery church dedicated to the English Saint Alban. The monastery ruins are still used for church ceremonies such as masses and weddings.
Several Viking graves and the remains of an Iron Age long house have also been found on the south side of the island.

Vestkapp
The part of Norway's mainland that is farthest west is in Selje. It is a precipitous rocky plateau, almost flat on top, that drops steeply down to the sea. In good weather, there is a panoramic view in all directions. It is immediately north of the village of Ervik.

Ervik
Ervik is located by the ocean near the West Cape at the end of the Stad peninsula. The Ervik Church is located here in memory of those who died when the coastal express ship Sanct Svithun was wrecked here after being mistakenly bombed in 1943 by Canadian planes. Ervik has a fine sandy beach which is popular for surfing, and a river rich in trout and salmon.

See also
List of former municipalities of Norway

References

External links
Municipal fact sheet from Statistics Norway 
Homepage of Selje
Independent information wiki for Selje
Promotional travel guide to Selje and Nordfjord

 
Stad, Norway
Former municipalities of Norway
1838 establishments in Norway
2020 disestablishments in Norway